Eristalis oestracea, the orange-tailed drone fly, is a species of hoverfly native to Europe and North America. In Europe it is found in bogs, moors, and coastal dunes. It nectars on white flowers in the carrot family (Apiaceae) and yellow flowers in the aster family (Asteraceae). It is very poorly known in North America. E. oestracea measures 14-15 mm in length.

References

Diptera of Europe
Eristalinae
Flies described in 1758
Taxa named by Carl Linnaeus